Igor Pavlovski (born 12 February 1982) is a Macedonian handball player for RK Zomimak and the Macedonian national team.

References

1982 births
Living people
Macedonian male handball players